Pangelinan is the Oceanian variant of Pangilinan. Notable people with the surname include:

Edward Pangelinan (born 1941), 1st Resident Representative from the Northern Mariana Islands to the United States House of Representatives
Ben Pangelinan (1955–2014), Guamanian politician and businessman
Lourdes Pangelinan (born 1954), director general of the Secretariat of the Pacific Community
Maria Frica Pangelinan, Northern Mariana Islander politician
Sean Pangelinan (born 1987), Guamanian canoeist
Susan Pangelinan (born 1961), United States Air Force officer
Zachary Pangelinan (born 1988), Guamanian footballer and rugby union player

See also
Pangilinan

Surnames of Oceanian origin